Julimar Cecilia Ávila Mancia (born 21 January 1997) is a Honduran swimmer. She competed in the women's 200 metre butterfly at the 2020 Summer Olympics. Ávila was born in Boston to Honduran parents.

References

External links
 
 Boston University Terriers bio

1997 births
Living people
Honduran female swimmers
Olympic swimmers of Honduras
Swimmers at the 2020 Summer Olympics
Boston University Terriers women's swimmers
American people of Honduran descent
Sportspeople from Boston
Swimmers at the 2014 Summer Youth Olympics